Sant Pere (St Peter) is a Gothic-Mudéjar style, Roman Catholic church located in the city of Xàtiva, Valencia, Spain. 

The church was erected in the mid 15th century. Roderic de Borja, future Pope Alexander VI, was baptized in this church. It underwent a later Baroque refurbishment.

References 

Pere
Mudéjar architecture in the Valencian Community
Gothic architecture in the Valencian Community
15th-century Roman Catholic church buildings in Spain